Alan Willoughby Dyer (born 8 July 1945) is an English former first-class cricketer.

Dyer was born at Winchester in July 1945. He later studied at St Catherine's College at the University of Oxford. While studying at Oxford, Dyer played first-class cricket for Oxford University, making his debut against Gloucestershire at Oxford in 1965. He played first-class cricket for Oxford until 1966, making 25 appearances. Playing as a wicket-keeper, he scored 765 runs in his 25 matches at an average of 23.90, with a high score of 67 which was one of three half centuries he made. Behind the stumps, he took 34 catches and made two stumpings. After graduating from Oxford, Dyer became a schoolteacher, teaching at The King's School, Canterbury.

References

External links

1945 births
Living people
Cricketers from Winchester
Alumni of St Catherine's College, Oxford
English cricketers
Oxford University cricketers
Schoolteachers from Kent